Yuriy Dmitriyevich Dubrovin (1 August 1939  – 4 December 2022) was a Russian-Ukrainian actor. Merited Artist of the Russian Federation (2007).

Among roles he played was La Chenet in D'Artagnan and Three Musketeers. He also appeared in Trial on the Road, and The Prisoner of Château d'If.

Career 
He debuted in 1959. Since 1963 he worked at Dovzhenko Film Studios in Kyiv. He acted in almost 140 films. He moved to Germany to his son's family in 2014. In 2016 he appeared in short film by his grandson, Ivan.

He was described as a "king of episodes" in cinema, having played episodic roles in dozens of marquee films.

Selected filmography
 Seven Winds (1962) as Senechka
 A Span of Earth (1964) as battalion orderly
 The Alive and the Dead (1964) as Zolotaryov
 We, the Russian People (1965) as Vyatskiy
 No Password Necessary (1967) as police officer
 At War as at War (1968) as soldier Gromykhalo
 Sergey Lazo (1968) as Korolyov
 Liberation (1970) as messenger man
 Dauria (1971) as Kuzma
 How the Steel Was Tempered (1968) as  Tonya Tumanova's father 
 Love at First Sight (1977) as gardener
 Widows (1978) as investigator
 Twenty Days Without War (1978) as Yolkin
 Lone Wolf (1978) as first man
 D'Artagnan and Three Musketeers (1978) as La Chenet
 Who will pay for Luck? (1980) as Paramonov
 Love by Request (1983) as Petrushin
 Wartime Romance (1983) as Terekhin
 Trial on the Road (1985) as Gennady Bolshakov
 Lilac Ball (1987) as episode
 The Prisoner of Château d'If (1987) as Baptiste, Count of Monte Cristo's servant
 Criminal Talent (1988) as educator Snegirev
 Musketeers Twenty Years After (1992) as La Chenet
 The Secret of Queen Anne or Musketeers Thirty Years After (1993) as La Chenet
 Life and Extraordinary Adventures of Private Ivan Chonkin (1994) as Volkov
 The Outskirts (1998) as Philip Ilyich Safronov
 Yesenin (2005) as Sergey Yesenin's grandfather

References

1939 births
2022 deaths
Soviet male actors
Russian male actors
Ukrainian male actors
Honored Artists of the Russian Federation
Gerasimov Institute of Cinematography alumni
People from Ryazan Oblast